In the Grip of Official Treason is the ninth spoken word album from Jello Biafra. It was released on 24 October 2006.

Track listing
Disc 1

Disc 2

Disc 3

Personnel
Steve Austin – engineer
Terry Campbell – contribution
George Carlin – author
Paul Dickerson - contribution
Dennis Kane – engineer
Marshall Lawless – producer
John Yates – layout design, imaging

References

2006 albums
Alternative Tentacles albums
Jello Biafra albums
Spoken word albums by American artists